Chahar Qash may refer to:
 Chahar Qash, Fars
 Chahar Qash-e Talkhab, Fars Province
 Chahar Qash, Andika, Khuzestan Province
 Chahar Qash (32°00′ N 49°53′ E), Izeh, Khuzestan Province
 Chahar Qash (32°03′ N 49°47′ E), Izeh, Khuzestan Province
 Chahar Qash, Masjed Soleyman, Khuzestan Province